Skhirat (Berber: ⴰⵙⵖⵉⵔⵔⴰⵜ) is a seaside town in Morocco situated between the administrative capital Rabat and the economic centre of Casablanca, known within Morocco for its idyllic beaches on the edge of the Atlantic Ocean.

Within the past decade it has steadily developed; especially with high class beach properties.

Life in Skhirat is distinguished between the rural population living from agricultural products, the agile municipal town center and the ocean site, where an authentic small harbour provides work for many fisherman.

History

20th century 
Located in Skhirat is the summer palace of the Moroccan King Mohammed VI, venue of a failed military coup against King Hassan II in July 1971. As Hassan II celebrated his 42nd birthday, nearly 250 dissenting Moroccan troops from Ahermoumou unsuccessfully stormed the palace. Following their failure, the alleged organizers of the rebellion were publicly executed.

21st century 
Skhirat is home to the Mohammed VI International Conference Center (CIC Mohamed VI). The CIC was constructed in the early 2000s by Britannia Hotels, meeting the demand for dedicated infrastructure to "organize international conferences" in Morocco's major cities.

In December 2015, the city again gained international notoriety as it became the host for the Skhirat agreement. This agreement, brokered by the major Libyan factions and the United Nations, came to fruition at the CIC Mohamed VI.

Places of interest 
The main beach, right beside the summer palace of the Moroccan King is a well-known spot for vacationers and weekend retreat for visitors from the capital Rabat. It has become a key rallying point for surfers from the whole region.

Two associations (Associations de Surf Skhirat Plage and Association des Jeunes Surfeurs de Skhirat) offer surf courses for all levels. They are located directly beside the "L'Amphitrite Palace Resort and Spa."

This luxury hotel offers a private beach appreciated by vacationers as well as international business travelers, because of its proximity to the CIC Mohammed VI (Le Centre Internationale des Conferences Mohammed VI).
https://skhirat.ma/

References

Populated coastal places in Morocco
Populated places in Rabat-Salé-Kénitra